GXMO (also fashioned as GxMO or GxmO) is an acronym for General X-Ray Machine Operator license. It may also refer to the licensing exam. Persons who possess this license may add this acronym after their name to demonstrate their qualification.

See also
Radiographer
Medical radiography

Notes

Radiology